George W. Creamer (1855 – June 27, 1886), born George W. Triebel, was an American Major League Baseball second baseman from Philadelphia, Pennsylvania. He played with four teams in two leagues: the Milwaukee Grays, the Syracuse Stars, the Worcester Ruby Legs (–), and the Pittsburgh Alleghenys (–).

On August 20, 1883, after a game between the Louisville Eclipse and the Alleghenys‚ Creamer and fellow players Billy Taylor and Mike Mansell were each fined $100 and suspended indefinitely for drunkenness. 

In , the Alleghenys finished with a 30-78-2 record and went through five managers. Creamer was the fourth of these managers, serving from August 6 to August 16 and losing all eight games he managed.

Creamer was signed by the Baltimore Orioles before the 1885 season, but in March, newspaper reports said that he was very sick with tuberculosis and not expected to play baseball again. Players from the Chiacgo White Stockings took up a collection for Creamer and gave him $65. A benefit for him was scheduled for May 1 at the Academy of Music in Pittsburgh. A July 1885 newspaper article referred to a benefit that raised $200 for Creamer.

In early May 1886, newspaper reports described Creamer as very ill in Waterbury, Connecticut. He died in Philadelphia, where he was interred at Greenwood Cemetery.

Creamer was a member of the Knights of Pythias.

See also

List of Major League Baseball player-managers

References

External links

1855 births
1886 deaths
19th-century baseball players
Major League Baseball second basemen
Baseball players from Philadelphia
Major League Baseball player-managers
Milwaukee Grays players
Syracuse Stars (NL) players
Worcester Ruby Legs players
Pittsburgh Alleghenys players
Pittsburgh Alleghenys managers
Pittsburgh Allegheny players
Rockford White Stockings players
Brooklyn Atlantics (minor league) players
19th-century deaths from tuberculosis
Burials at Greenwood Cemetery (Philadelphia)
Tuberculosis deaths in Pennsylvania